Azbeki is a village in Ahmadabad Rural District, in the Central District of Nazarabad County, Alborz Province, Iran. At the 2006 census, its population was 69, in 16 families.

References 

Populated places in Nazarabad County